The Riverside Rubes/Dons were a minor league baseball team, based in Riverside, California that played in the Sunset League from 1947 to 1950.

External links
Baseball Reference

Defunct California League teams
Defunct Sunset League teams
Defunct baseball teams in California
Pittsburgh Pirates minor league affiliates
Cincinnati Reds minor league affiliates
Sports in Riverside, California
Baseball teams disestablished in 1950
Baseball teams established in 1941